American Standard Brands is a North American manufacturer of plumbing fixtures, based in Piscataway, New Jersey, United States. It is principally owned by the Lixil Group, with Bain Capital Partners holding a minority stake. The company was formed as American Standard Americas from the North American operations of the kitchen and bathroom division of the American Standard Companies during a breakup of the company in 2007. Crane Plumbing and Eljer were merged into the company in 2008 creating American Standard Brands.

In addition to its namesake American Standard brand, the company also produces products under the Crane, Eljer, Fiat, Sanymetal, and Showerite brands.

History 

On February 1, 2007, American Standard Companies announced it would break up its three divisions.  The plan included the sale of its kitchen and bath division and the spin off of WABCO Holdings, American Standard's vehicle controls division, while retaining the Trane Company.

On October 31, 2007, American Standard announced it had completed the sale of the kitchen and bath division to Bain Capital Partners, LLC.  This included the sale of the American Standard name to Bain.

In the meantime, American Standard retained the rights to use the "American Standard" name for HVAC products.  American Standard subsequently changed its name to Trane on November 28, 2007. Later in 2007, Ingersoll Rand bought Trane, acquiring the Trane and American Standard brand names. Ingersoll Rand has continued to produce HVAC equipment under both names.

Bain Capital created American Standard Americas from the North American units of the bath and kitchen business units acquired from American Standard Companies. Bain sold a majority stake in American Standard Americas to Sun Capital Partners on November 27, 2007.

In February 2008, American Standard Americas merged with two other plumbing fixture companies, Crane Plumbing and Eljer to create American Standard Brands.  The Crane Plumbing unit includes the former Universal-Rundle product line which Crane acquired in 1995 and continues to support with repair parts.  Crane also has a Canadian subsidiary Crane Plumbing Corporation.

In June 2013, the Japanese firm Lixil Group agreed to purchase American Standard Brands from Sun Capital Partners.

In 2015, American Standard was recognized for the top spot for "Brand Familiarity" in Bathroom Accessories category by the Builder Magazine.

See also 
 Ideal Standard, former European and Latin American operations of American Standard's predecessor.
 American Radiator Building
 John B. Pierce
 Primary competitors: Delta, Kohler, Moen, Pfister, Toto

References

External links 
 

Manufacturing companies established in 1929
Companies based in Middlesex County, New Jersey
Manufacturing companies based in New Jersey
Piscataway, New Jersey
Bathroom fixture companies
Lixil Group
2013 mergers and acquisitions
American subsidiaries of foreign companies
Building materials companies of the United States